Otto Separy (born 5 August 1957 in Kubila) is a Papua New Guinean clergyman and bishop for the Roman Catholic Diocese of Aitape. He was appointed bishop in 2009. He left for Bereina in 2019.

See also
Catholic Church in Papua New Guinea

References

External links

Papua New Guinean Roman Catholic bishops
Roman Catholic bishops of Bereina
Roman Catholic bishops of Aitape
Living people
1957 births